Flamenco at 5:15 is a 1983 short documentary film directed by Cynthia Scott, taking audiences inside a flamenco dance class at the National Ballet School of Canada. Produced by Studio D, the women's studio of the National Film Board of Canada, the film won an Oscar at the 56th Academy Awards in 1984 for Documentary Short Subject.

Cast
 Susana Robledo as Herself (as Susana)
 Antonio Robledo as Himself

See also
Flamenco (1995 film), a 1995 documentary

References

External links

 Watch Flamenco at 5:15 at NFB.ca

1983 films
1983 documentary films
1983 short films
1980s dance films
Canadian short documentary films
English-language Canadian films
Best Documentary Short Subject Academy Award winners
Documentary films about flamenco
National Film Board of Canada documentaries
National Film Board of Canada short films
Canadian dance films
1980s English-language films
1980s Canadian films
1980s short documentary films